Sarudu Football Club (simply known as Sarudu FC) is an Indonesian football club based in Pasangkayu Regency, West Sulawesi. They currently compete in the Liga 3.

References

External links

Football clubs in Indonesia
Football clubs in West Sulawesi
Association football clubs established in 2021
2021 establishments in Indonesia